The 2020 Liga de Elite is the 48 season of the Liga de Elite, the top Macanese league for association football clubs since its establishment in 1973. The season began on 18 September 2020.

Effects of the 2020 coronavirus pandemic
As a consequence of the COVID-19 pandemic in Macau, the season's start was delayed until September. 

On 3 September 2020, the Macau Football Association announced that the 2020 season would begin on 18 September 2020. Teams will play a single round robin format and players are required to undergo nucleic acid testing prior to every match. If the season is delayed at any point due to an outbreak, the clubs have agreed to cancel the season so that the 2021 season can begin on time. 

There will be no promotion or relegation for the season.

Team location

League table

Results

References

External links
Macau Football Association 

Campeonato da 1ª Divisão do Futebol seasons
Macau
1
Liga de Elite, 2020